SM UC-20 was a German Type UC II minelaying submarine or U-boat in the German Imperial Navy during World War I. The U-boat was ordered on 29 August 1915 and was launched on 1 April 1916. She was commissioned into the German Imperial Navy on 7 September 1916 as SM UC-20. In 13 patrols UC-20 was credited with sinking 21 ships, either by torpedo or by mines laid. UC-20 was surrendered on 16 January 1919 and broken up at Preston in 1919–20.

Design
Like all pre-UC-25 German Type UC II submarines, UC-20 had a displacement of  when at the surface and  while submerged. The submarine was powered by two six-cylinder four-stroke diesel engines each producing  (a total of ), two electric motors producing , and two propeller shafts.

UC-20 was fitted with six  mine tubes, eighteen UC 200 mines, three  torpedo tubes (one on the stern and two on the bow), seven torpedoes, and one  Uk L/30 deck gun. Her complement was twenty-six crew members.

Summary of raiding history

References

Notes

Citations

Bibliography

 
 

Ships built in Hamburg
German Type UC II submarines
U-boats commissioned in 1916
World War I minelayers of Germany
World War I submarines of Germany
1916 ships